Dalia Mahmoud Quotb El Behery (born October 15, 1970) is an Egyptian actress. She won the 1990 title of Miss Egypt, and placed 27th in the 1990 Miss Universe pageant in Los Angeles.

Biography
El Behery received a bachelor's degree from the Faculty of Tourism and Hotels at Helwan University, and worked in prelude programs on the Egyptian Satellite Channel and modeling. Her first notable appearance was in a video clip of the song "Tegeesh neaeesh", by Ali El Haggar. Her modeling career paved the road for her acting profession. She has worked with stars such as Adel Imam in his film Al Safara fe Al Emara along with other comedians and singers including Hany Ramzy, Moustafa Amar and Khaled Selim.

El Behery said in one of her interviews on television that she wishes to embody the role of pharaonic Queen "Nefertiti" on the screen, denying rumors that she was reluctant about the portrayal of the Queen "Cleopatra" by the Syrian actress Solaf Fawakhirji.

From 2008 to 2013, she married the businessman Farid El Mourchedi (known as Fred Morse), the grandson of artist Farid Shawki from his daughter the producer Nahed Farid Shawki. Dalia and Farid had a daughter named Khadija, who died at the age of 8 months because of a rare disease. In 2016, El Behery married Hassan Samy.

El Behery signed on as a Goodwill Ambassador for World Stroke Day in November 2010,

Political views 
In a telephone conversation with the channel "Al Arabiya", she expressed her happiness with the peaceful Egyptian Revolution of 2011 and the demands for basic rights like freedom, political reform and a joint effort for nation building. In the meantime, Dalia said the absence of security made her feel worried, like the rest of the population. The worry, she explained, has been getting constantly worse after hundreds of prisoners fled the prison of Al Faiyum. She added that the youth revolt had ignited in the Egyptian streets and she thanked her fellow Egyptians who united to guard public property, especially the Egyptian Museum.

Filmography

External links

Dalia El  Behery on MSN Arabia
Elghawas (film) website

References

1970 births
Egyptian female models
Egyptian film actresses
Helwan University alumni
Living people
Miss Egypt winners
Miss Universe 1990 contestants
Miss World 1990 delegates